Lander Seynaeve (born 29 May 1992) is a Belgian professional racing cyclist.

References

External links

1992 births
Living people
Belgian male cyclists
People from Pontoise
21st-century Belgian people